Beata Elżbieta Kozidrak (born 4 May 1960) is a Polish singer and songwriter. She is the lead singer and lyricist for the Polish iconic pop-rock band – BAJM. She is one of the most popular singers in Poland. She has a four-octave vocal range. and reaches the whistle register.

Career 
Her career began in 1978, when she was placed second at the National Festival of Polish Song in Opole, performing the song Piechotą do lata, as a member of Bajm band.

Personal life 
She is the youngest of three siblings. She has a sister, Mariola, and had a brother, Jarosław Kozidrak. In childhood, she lived at 36A Grodzka Street in Lublin.

She is an ex-wife of Andrzej Pietras (married from 1979 until 8 July 2016), co-founder and manager of the Bajm band, with whom she has two daughters: Katarzyna (born 7 December 1981) and Agata (born 22 September 1993).

Discography

Solo albums

Compilation albums

Awards 
 1986 – Grand Prix at the Baltic States Song Festival in Karlshamn, Sweden with the song Diament i sól
 1987 – Grand Prix at the Midnight Sun Festival in Lahti, Finland with the song Hurry My Love
 1999 – two Fryderyk awards: Best Vocalist and Best Pop Album (Beata)
 2001 – Fryderyk, "Vocalist of the Year"
 2006 – Złote Dzioby, Radio WAWA, "Album of the Year"
 2015 – Amber Nighnigale Lifetime Achievement Award at the Polsat SuperHit Festival
 2019 – Icon of Culture Award presented by the Wprost magazine
 2020 – Woman of the Year presented by the Glamour magazine

References

External links 

1960 births
20th-century Polish women singers
21st-century Polish women singers
21st-century Polish singers
EMI Group artists
Women rock singers
Living people
Musicians from Lublin
Polish pop singers
Polish rock singers
Polish singer-songwriters
Sony Music artists